Kigulu-Buzimba was a Basoga chiefdom in pre-colonial Uganda. It was split off from the principality of Kigulu in 1806 and reunited with it in 1899, after coming under British rule.

References

History of Uganda